Jacques Borel (born 9 April 1927) is a French businessman known for introducing fast food to France. For his accomplishments in this area, he is known as the "Napoléon du prêt-à-manger" (Napoleon of ready-to-eat foods).

Career
On 31 May 1961, he opened France's first hamburger restaurant, a franchise of the American company Wimpy. The venue was the Rue du 4 Septembre in the 2nd arrondissement of Paris. Borel saw hamburgers served to table as a winning option, as the only other competitor was cold pork sandwiches served at bars. In addition, ground beef was growing as an option, as increased female employment limited the amount of time that remained for women to cook beef at home. His portfolio expanded to 15 restaurants in Paris and five in the rest of the country, but they disappeared before the end of the decade due to disputes with head office in the UK; McDonald's then came to France in 1972.

In 1962, Borel pioneered the Ticket Restaurant, vouchers sold to large employers to feed employers instead of using their own cafeterias. He had discovered the practice in the UK. By 1967, the practice was recognised by the state and no taxes were required on it.

Borel was a pioneer of motorway restaurants, and his record for sales in one day was to 14,238 people at an outlet on the A6 in the summer. He said "the most difficult thing was not feeding all those holiday makers, but keeping the toilets clean". His investment company Jacques Borel International bought the 4-star hotel chain Sofitel, but its failure due to his lack of experience in the sector led to him being ousted by the board in 1977. After failed experiments in fast food in the United States, Mexico and Brazil, he returned to France and opened Jacques Borel Consultants in 1994, who successfully lobbied for a reduced value-added tax of 5.5% in French restaurants.

Recognition
He was the inspiration for the character Jacques Tricatel in the 1976 French film The Wing or the Thigh (L'Aile ou la Cuisse), based on the confrontation between traditional French cuisine and fast food at the time.

In 2008, Borel was made a Chevalier of the Legion of Honor.

References

1927 births
Living people
Businesspeople from Paris
French restaurateurs
French hoteliers
Chevaliers of the Légion d'honneur
French lobbyists